Clearcreek Township, Ohio, may refer to:

Clearcreek Township, Fairfield County, Ohio
Clearcreek Township, Warren County, Ohio

See also
 Clear Creek Township, Ashland County, Ohio
 Clear Creek Township (disambiguation)

Ohio township disambiguation pages